Al-Shaitat, in Standard Arabic al-Shuʿaytāt, is a Sunni Arab clan which lives in the Deir ez-Zor Governorate in eastern Syria. Its membership numbers between 70,000 and 90,000 and it is led by Sheikh Rafaa Aakla al-Raju. In the local Arab dialect, the "u" is not pronounced and since the ʿayn sound often is not transcribed, the name is written Shaitat, Shaytat, Sheitat, Sheitaat and the like. The last vowel is long, therefore sometimes it is written with a double "a". Henry Field identified the Shaitat as a clan of the Aqaidat.

Conflict with the Islamic State 

Since July 2014, the Shaitat clan has been in conflict with the Islamic State. The clan battled to retain control of their area against encroachments by the Islamic State in 2014 but was defeated. Later they were able to push out the Islamic State again but eventually they lost the battle.

In August 2014, Islamic State fighters committed a massacre by shooting, beheading, and crucifying some 700-900+ members of the Shaitat clan over a period of three days. It became the bloodiest single atrocity committed by the Islamic State in Syria. The Abu Hamam area, between Mayadin and Hajin, where important parts of the clan lived, has been abandoned with many bodies that remain uncollected.

In mid December 2014, it was reported that a mass grave with some 230 Shaitat clansmen in Deir ez-Zor Governorate was found by their relatives. This brought the number of Shaitat tribal members killed by the Islamic State since summer 2014 to more than 900. Islamic State propaganda in 2015 boasted about the return of some Shaitat civilians but still focused on ongoing tribal opposition.

In 2020 26 more victims from the Shaitat clan were discovered in the countryside of Deir ez-Zor. 25 were identified by relatives and one remained unknown speculated to be from Al-Zubari village. The remains of the identified were reburied in the cemetery in Abu Hamam.

See also  
 Albu Nimr

References 

Tribes of Syria
Tribes of Arabia